Patrick Anderson may refer to:

 Patrick Anderson (physician), physician and author
 Patrick Anderson of Walston, minister and prisoner on the Bass Rock
 Patrick Anderson (Jesuit) (1575–1624), Scottish Jesuit and partisan of Mary Queen of Scots
 Patrick Anderson (poet) (1915–1979), English-born Canadian poet
 Patrick Anderson (assemblyman) (1719–1793), officer in French and Indian War and American Revolution, member of the Pennsylvania Assembly
 Patrick Anderson (Oklahoma politician) (born 1967), Republican United States politician from the U.S. state of Oklahoma
 Patrick Anderson, former president of the Jamaica Football Federation
 Patrick Anderson (wheelchair basketball) (born 1979), Canadian wheelchair basketball player

See also
 Patrik Andersson (disambiguation)